The 2013 Men's Pan-American Volleyball Cup was the eighth edition of the annual men's volleyball tournament, played by seven countries. It was held in Mexico City, Mexico from 19 to 24 August 2013.

Pools composition

Squads

Venue
Gimnasio Olímpico Juan de la Barrera, Mexico City, Mexico

Pool standing procedure
 Numbers of matches won
 Match points
 Points ratio
 Sets ratio
 Result of the last match between the tied teams

Match won 3–0: 5 match points for the winner, 0 match points for the loser
Match won 3–1: 4 match points for the winner, 1 match point for the loser
Match won 3–2: 3 match points for the winner, 2 match points for the loser

Preliminary round
All times are Central Daylight Time (UTC−05:00).

Pool A

Pool B

Final round
All times are Central Daylight Time (UTC−05:00).

Quarterfinals

Semifinals

5th place match

6th place match

3rd place match

Final

Final standing

Awards

Best players

Most Valuable Player
  Ricardo Lucarelli
Best Scorer
  Elvis Contreras
Best Spiker
  Elvis Contreras
Best Blocker
  Maurício Souza
Best Server
  Taylor Sander
Best Digger
  Tomás Ruiz
Best Setter
  Juan Finoli
Best Receiver
  Reynold Rangel
Best Libero
  Gregory Berrios

All–star team

Best Setter
  Juan Finoli
Best Outside Spikers
  Elvis Contreras
  Taylor Sander
Best Middle Blockers
  Maurício Souza
  Isac Santos
Best Opposite Spiker
  Renan Buiatti
Best Libero
  Gregory Berrios

External links
Official website

Men's Pan-American Volleyball Cup
International volleyball competitions hosted by Mexico
Men's Pan-American Volleyball Cup
Men's Pan-American Volleyball Cup
Men's Pan-American Volleyball Cup